Golden Psalter may refer to:

Golden Psalter of Charlemagne, also called the Dagulf Psalter
Golden Psalter of St. Gallen